Tahirović is a Bosniak surname. It is derived from "son of Tahir". 
It may refer to the following people:
Denis Tahirović (born 1985), Croatian footballer
Emil Tahirovič (born 1979), Slovenian swimmer
Emra Tahirović (born 1987), Bosnian-Swedish footballer 
Enid Tahirović (born 1972), Bosnian handball player
Haris Tahirović (born 1981), Bosnian footballer
Hedina Tahirović-Sijerčić (born 1960), Bosnian Gurbeti Romani journalist, broadcaster, writer, translator, linguistic researcher and teacher
Ivan Tahirovič  (born 1965), Slovenian football player
Nesim Tahirović (1941–2020), Bosnian painter

See also
Nameštaj Tahirović, Serbian furniture company

Bosnian surnames
Patronymic surnames